Mahaut may refer to:

 Mahaut (Mathilda), Countess of Artois
 Mahaut of Châtillon
 Mahaut River (disambiguation)
 Mahaut, Dominica
 Antoine Mahaut (c. 1720 – 1785), composer